Brad Riley (born 2 July 1974) is a New Zealand basketball player. He competed in the men's tournament at the 2000 Summer Olympics. At club level, he represented the Nelson Giants.

References

External links
 

1974 births
Living people
New Zealand men's basketball players
Nelson Giants players
Olympic basketball players of New Zealand
Basketball players at the 2000 Summer Olympics
Sportspeople from Hamilton, New Zealand